William "Skinny" Elijah Smith (1913–1997) was an African American artist who was recognized for exploring Black experiences in his art. Friend and poet Langston Hughes once described Smith's work as the "humor and pathos of Negro life captured in line and color."

Personal life 
William E. Smith was born in 1913 in Chattanooga, Tennessee. Shortly after the death of his mother, Smith moved to Cleveland, Ohio in 1927 along with his two younger siblings, to join his father. As a result of his father's opposition to his artistic aspirations, Smith left home in 1932, where he learned about the hardships and struggles of everyday life in Cleveland. Surviving on only twenty cents a day and living in the basement of Central Avenue's Grand Central Theatre, Smith was discovered by two Oberlin graduates, Russell and Rowena Jelliffe, founders of what is now considered to be Karamu House. After earning the five year Gilpin Players' Scholarship, Smith attended the John Huntington Polytechnic Institute in Cleveland from 1935 to 1940. It was during the time of Smith's studies at the institute that he began showing in the Cleveland Museum of Art's annual May Show, where his work was exhibited on and off between 1936 and 1949. Smith also went on to further studies at the Cleveland School of Art (today known as the Cleveland Institute of Art) and the Chouinard Art Institute in Los Angeles.

Artistic career

Early work 
In the early 1930s, Smith began his studies at Karamu House under the leadership of Karamu House Studio director Richard R. Beatty. A lithographer trained at the Carnegie Institute of Art and The School of The Art Institute of Chicago, Beatty served as Smith's mentor affording him the opportunity to explore the various techniques and styles of printmaking. With Beatty's influence in 1932, Smith became an instructor of the arts of Karamu House Studios. Continuing his apprenticeship, Smith attended Saturday morning classes at the Cleveland Museum under the teachings of artist Paul Travis.

Having designed numerous stage sets and posters and produced more than 30 costume designs at Karamu House, the most notable being his costume designs for Shirley Graham Du Bois' opera, Tom Tom: An Epic of Music and the Negro (1932). Smith was awarded a five-year Gilpin Scholarship to attend the John Huntington Polytechnic Institute from academic years 1935 to 1940.

Karamu Artists Inc. and World War II 

Between 1938 and 1940, Smith participated in 19 exhibitions as part of a group with Karamu Artists Incorporated. The organization was a professional network that was formally established in 1940. Art critic and artist Grace V. Kelly wrote of the new integration of the organization and purpose for its members in the Cleveland Plain Dealer: [...] the dual purpose of bringing [the work its members] before the publicans of acquainting the community and the nation with the merits of Negro artists and craftsmen in all our centers of art.However, the organization was short-lived after the mobilization for World War II began. Several of its core members like: Smith, Lee-Smith, Sallée, Brown, Fred Carlo, and Thomas Usher were dispersed shortly after. Smith served as a WWII assistant photographer in the army's educational department.

After World War II and California 
Following his army service in 1946, Smith continued his art education in illustration, advertising, and opened his own graphic arts studio. Smith later became an art director for an advertising agency in the late 1940s. After the death of his brother in 1949, Smith moved to Los Angeles, California to be near his sister.

In Los Angeles, Smith associated with his former colleague from Karamu House, Curtis Tann. Together, Smith and Tann cofounded the Eleven Associated Artists Gallery, the first Los Angeles gallery devoted specifically to African American art. In the early 1950s, Smith was hired as a blueprint draftsman in the sign design division at Lockheed Corporation, allowing him to continue to pursue teaching and his own art. From 1956 to 1960, Smith continued his studies at the Chouinard Art Institute. As Smith broadened his education in 1960, he also cofounded Art West Associated, a professional black artists organization. Reporter William C. Roberson writes of the purpose and success the organization replicates for its members in an article of the Call and Post, Smith is a member of a professional black art group "Art West Association Inc." A group that has moved as a force to get their art works displayed at the Los Angeles County Museum[...] The group founded in 1960 has displayed its work throughout Los Angeles. In banks, churches, private homes and concerts in a massive effort to enlighten the public to the expertise of black artists.In the early 1970s, Smith continued to pursue art by publishing illustrations of subjects from African American history for Cleveland's New Day Press. In his lifetime, Smith won many awards and accolades for his work and philanthropy. In 1976, Karamu organized a retrospective of his work, From Umbrella Staves to Brush and Easel.

Selected exhibitions 
1936–49 Cleveland May Show

1935–41 Cleveland Museum of Art, Cleveland, Ohio

1939 Dayton Art Institute

1938 Connecticut Academy of Fine Arts

1940 American Negro Exposition

1942 Association of American Artists Galleries

1943 Library of Congress

1942 Atlanta University

1966-8 National Academy of Design

1968 Oakland Museum

1969 Atlanta University

1996 Cleveland State University, Cleveland, Ohio

1996-7 The Butler Institute of American Art, Youngstown, Ohio

1997 Riffe Gallery, Columbus, Ohio

Denver Art Museum

Fyre Museum

Benedict Art Gallery, Chicago (one-person exhibition)

Lyman Brothers Gallery, Indianapolis (one-person exhibition)

YMCA, Los Angeles (one-person exhibition)

Florenz Gallery, Los Angeles (one-person exhibition)

Selected collections 

 Cleveland Museum of Art, Cleveland, Ohio
 Cleveland State University, Cleveland, Ohio
 Golden State Insurance Co., Los Angeles
 Howard University, Washington D.C.
 Karamu House, Cleveland, Ohio
 Library of Congress, Washington D.C.
 Oakland Museum, Oakland, California
 The Metropolitan Museum of Art, New York

Selected works

References

External links 

 List of works by William E. Smith in the May Show at the Cleveland Museum of Art: 1936
 List of works by William E. Smith in the May Show at the Cleveland Museum of Art: 1937
 List of works by William E. Smith in the May Show at the Cleveland Museum of Art: 1938
 List of works by William E. Smith in the May Show at the Cleveland Museum of Art: 1939
 List of works by William E. Smith in the May Show at the Cleveland Museum of Art: 1940
 List of works by William E. Smith in the May Show at the Cleveland Museum of Art: 1941
 List of works by William E. Smith in the May Show at the Cleveland Museum of Art: 1943
 List of works by William E. Smith in the May Show at the Cleveland Museum of Art: 1949

Further reading 

 Rahn, Zita, and Ursula Korneitchouk. Yet Still We Rise: African American Art in Cleveland, 1920–1970. Cleveland, Ohio: Cleveland Artists Foundation, 1996, p. 28, 80-81.
 Jelliffe, Russell W., Rowena Jelliffee, and John Hunter. The Russell and Rowena Jelliffe Collection: Prints and Drawings from the Karamu Workshop, 1929–1941. Cleveland, Ohio: Cleveland State University Art Gallery, 1994.
 Robinson, William H., and David Steinberg. Transformations in Cleveland Art, 1796–1946: Community and Diversity in Early Modern America. Cleveland, Ohio: Cleveland Museum of Art, 1996.
 Collins, Lisa Gail, et al. African-American Artists, 1929–1945 Prints, Drawings, and Paintings in the Metropolitan Museum of Art. Metropolitan Museum of Art, 2003.
Samella Lewis. African American Art and Artists. Rev. ed. (1st ed., 1978, Art: African American). Berkeley, 1990, p. 255.
Rotraud Sackerlotzky. Cleveland's African Images, circa 1920–1960. Exh. cat., Cleveland Artists Foundation, Northeast Ohio Art Museum. Cleveland, 1990.
Kusmer, Kenneth L. A Ghetto Takes Shape: Black Cleveland, 1870–1930. University of Illinois Press, 1978, p. 165.

1913 births
1997 deaths
African-American artists
20th-century African-American people